An au pair is a person who takes care of children.

Au pair or au pairs can refer to:
Au Pair (film series)
Au Pair (film), a 1999 romantic comedy
Au Pairs, a music group

See also
Au Pair Girls, a movie